Alexander Willem Maurits Carel Ver Huell, also: Verhuell orVerHuell (Doesburg, 7 March 1822 – Arnhem, 28 May 1897) was a Dutch artist and writer.

Life 
Ver Huell was the son of Quirijn Maurits Rudolph Ver Huell, naval officer and naturalist, and jkvr. Christina Louisa Johanna Hester de Vaynes van Brakell, aquarellist. After his secondary education in Rotterdam he studied law at Leiden University, where he obtained a doctorate on propositions After he finished his studies he moved permanently to Arnhem. He was very wealthy, which enabled him to become a philanthropist. Among his many donations to good works was a large gift to the Stichting  Asyl voor oude en gebrekkige zeelieden in Brielle in 1872. In 1897 he made the municipality of Arnhem heir to his collection of works of art, which formed the basis for the collection of Museum Arnhem. After his death it turned out that he left a bequest of 1 million guilders to the municipality of Doesburg to be used for the construction of a bridge across the river IJssel.

Ver Huell didn't lead a life of leisure, however. He became renowned for his humoristic sketches both in written form and in the form of illustrations and cartoons., often directed at the life of university students. He used the pseudonym O.Veralby, which is a Dutch pun. If one pronounces it quickly it sounds like overal bij (present everywhere). Under this pseudonym he produced illustrations for the Dutch satirical writer Johannes Kneppelhout, who used the pseudonym Klikspaan.

Ver Huell's last days were sad and lonely. He died, 75 years old, in his residence Arnhem.

Publications

Original publications
Vier boeken in het leven (1851)
Zijn er zoo? (1851)
Schetsen met de pen, (Amsterdam, 3 vols. 1853, 1861, 1876);
De mensch op en buiten de aarde. Gedachten over ruimte, tijd en eeuwigheid, (anonymous; Amsterdam 1855);
Volk en kunst (Amsterdam 1862);
Cornelis Troost en zijne werken (Arnhem 1873);

Editions of surveys
Werken. Deel 1: Zijn er zoo? (1899)
Werken. Deel 2: Zoo zijn er! Jeugd (1899)
Werken. Deel 3: Zie daar! Scherts en Ernst (1899)
Werken. Deel 4. Denkende beeldjes. Eerste en laatste studenten-schetsen (1900)
Werken. Deel 5. Afspiegelingen. Ze zijn er! (1900)
Het dagboek van Alexander Ver Huell 1860 - 1865 (1985)

Contributions to other publications

Notes

References

Sources

1822 births
1897 deaths
Dutch humorists
Dutch satirists
Dutch parodists
Dutch comics writers
Leiden University alumni